The Vélodrome d'Anvers Zuremborg was a velodrome located in Antwerp, Belgium. A 400-metre track, it hosted the track cycling events for the 1920 Summer Olympics. The British media referred to the venue as The Garden City Velodrome.

References
Sports-reference.com profile of Cycling at the 1920 Summer Olympics.

Venues of the 1920 Summer Olympics
Defunct sports venues in Belgium
Velodromes in Belgium
Olympic cycling venues
Sports venues in Antwerp Province
Buildings and structures in Antwerp